The NBA All-Defensive Team is an annual National Basketball Association (NBA) honor given since the 1968–69 NBA season to the best defensive players during the regular season.  The All-Defensive Team is generally composed of ten players in two five-man lineups, a first and a second team. Voting is conducted by a panel of 123 writers and broadcasters. Prior to the 2013–14 NBA season, voting was performed by the NBA head coaches, who were restricted from voting for players on their own team. The players each receive two points for each first team vote and one point for each second team vote. The top five players with the highest point total make the first team, with the next five making the second team. In the case of a tie at the fifth position of either team, the roster is expanded. If the first team consists of six players due to a tie, the second team will still consist of five players with the potential for more expansion in the event of additional ties. Ties have occurred several times, most recently in 2013 when Tyson Chandler and Joakim Noah tied in votes received.

Tim Duncan holds the record for the most total selections to the All-Defensive Team with 15. Kevin Garnett and Kobe Bryant follow with 12 total honors each, and Kareem Abdul-Jabbar has 11 total selections. Michael Jordan, Gary Payton, Garnett and Bryant share the record for most NBA All-Defensive first team selections with nine. Scottie Pippen, Bobby Jones, and Duncan made the first team eight times each. Walt Frazier, Dennis Rodman and Chris Paul made the All-Defensive first team seven times.

When the coaches were responsible for voting, there were occasionally inconsistencies between the All-Defensive Team and the NBA Defensive Player of the Year Award, which has been voted on by the media. On four occasions, the Defensive Player of the Year winner was not voted to the All-Defensive first team in the same year. Player of the Year winners Alvin Robertson (1986), Dikembe Mutombo (1995), Tyson Chandler (2012) and Marc Gasol (2013) were instead named to the second team.

Selections

Most selections 
The following table lists the top ten players with the most overall selections.

See also
All-NBA Team

Notes

 The Defensive Player of the Year award was first established in 1983.
 Sanders has been inducted to the Naismith Hall as a contributor.
 Sloan has been inducted to the Naismith Hall as a coach.
 Before the 1971–72 season, Lew Alcindor changed his name to Kareem Abdul-Jabbar.
 When Olajuwon arrived to the United States, the University of Houston incorrectly spelled his first name "Akeem". He used that spelling until March 9, 1991, when he announced that he would add an H.
 Ron Artest changed his name into Metta World Peace on September 16, 2011.

References
General

Specific

All-Defensive Team
National Basketball Association lists